Classics Illustrated is an American comic book/magazine series featuring adaptations of literary classics such as Les Misérables, Moby-Dick, Hamlet, and The Iliad.  Created by Albert Kanter, the series began publication in 1941 and finished its first run in 1969, producing 169 issues. Following the series' demise, various companies reprinted its titles. Since then, the Classics Illustrated brand has been used to create new comic book adaptations. This series is different from the Great Illustrated Classics, which is an adaptation of the classics for young readers that includes illustrations, but is not in the comic book form.

1941–1971: Elliot / Gilberton 
Recognizing the appeal of early comic books, Russian-born publisher Albert Lewis Kanter (1897–1973) believed he could use the new medium to introduce young and reluctant readers to "great literature".  He created Classic Comics for Elliot Publishing Company in 1941 with its debut issues being The Three Musketeers, followed by Ivanhoe and The Count of Monte Cristo. The first five titles were published irregularly under the banner "Classic Comics Presents", while issues #6 and 7 were published under the banner "Classic Comics Library" with a ten-cent cover price. Arabian Nights (issue #8), illustrated by Lillian Chestney, is the first issue to use the "Classics Comics" banner.

With the fourth issue, The Last of the Mohicans, in 1942, Kanter moved the operation to different offices, and the corporate identity was changed to the Gilberton Company, Inc. Reprints of previous titles began in 1943. World War II paper shortages forced Kanter to reduce the 64-page format to 56 pages. Some titles were packaged in gift boxes of threes or fours during the period, with specific themes such as adventure or mystery.

Classic Comics is marked by varying quality in art and is celebrated today for its often garish but highly collectible line-drawn covers. Original edition Classic Comics in "near mint" condition command prices in the thousands of dollars.

With issue #35 in March 1947 (The Last Days of Pompeii) the series' name was changed to Classics Illustrated. In 1948, rising paper costs reduced books to 48 pages. In 1951 (issue #81), line-drawn covers were replaced with painted covers, and the price was raised from 10 cents to 15 cents (and, at a later date, to 25 cents).

Classics Illustrated benefitted from nationwide distribution (thanks to an agreement with Curtis Circulation) beginning in late 1951, and Kanter began promoting the series as an educational tool. Despite this, Dr. Jekyll and Mr. Hyde (issue #13) and Uncle Tom's Cabin (issue #15) were both cited in Dr. Fredric Wertham's 1954 condemnation of comic books Seduction of the Innocent, in the first case for reducing the story to little more than its violent elements, and in the second case for simplifying the full characterizations of the book to stereotypes.

Classics Illustrated #65 — Benjamin Franklin (published in November 1949) — written by Adelaide Lee (adaptation) and illustrated by Alex Blum, Robert Hebberd, and Gus Schrotter, was given the 1956 Thomas Alva Edison Foundation National Mass Media Award for Best American History Comic Book.

As Classics Illustrated became more standardized in the 1950s, Gilberton re-issued earlier editions with new art (and sometimes new script adaptations). All editions were re-issued with new cover art in the 1950s and '60s.

In addition to Classics Illustrated, Kanter presided over its spin-offs Classics Illustrated Junior (1953), Classics Illustrated Special Issue (1955), and The World Around Us (1958). Between 1941 and 1962, sales totaled 200 million.

Of the original 169 issues of Classic Comics/Classics Illustrated produced in the period 1941–1969, the writers with the most representation included Jules Verne, with ten works adapted; Alexandre Dumas, with nine; James Fenimore Cooper, with eight; and Robert Louis Stevenson, with seven. Charles Dickens, Walter Scott, William Shakespeare, Mark Twain, and H. G. Wells were all well-represented, with five works adapted each. Seven female authors had their work adapted. Up through 1951, all adaptations were from work in the public domain. Beginning in 1952, the series occasionally created authorized adaptations of popular 20th-century fiction by such authors as Charles Nordhoff & James Norman Hall (four of their novels), Frank Buck (two of his novels), Charles Boardman Hawes (two novels), Erich Maria Remarque, Talbot Mundy, Walter Van Tilburg Clark, and Emerson Hough.

In addition to the literary adaptations, each issue of Classics Illustrated featured author profiles, educational fillers, and an advertisement for the coming title. In later editions, a catalog of titles and a subscription order form appeared on back covers.

The publication of new titles in the U.S. ceased in 1962 for various reasons. The company lost its second-class mailing permit; and cheap paperbacks, Cliff's Notes, and television drew readers away from the series. Kanter's last new title was issue #167 Faust (August 1962), though other titles had been planned. Two of these titles – an adaptation of G. A. Henty's In Freedom's Cause, and the original title, Negro Americans: The Early Years – appeared in the company's foreign editions. In addition, in 1962–1963, the British publisher Thorpe & Porter, which at that point was owned by Gilberton, produced 13 new issues of Classics Illustrated, which were never published in the U.S. Most of the script adaptations were done by Classics Illustrated editor Alfred Sundel.

In 1967, Kanter sold his company to Twin Circle Publishing Co. and its conservative Catholic publisher Patrick Frawley, whose Frawley Corporation in 1969 finally published In Freedom's Cause and Negro Americans, but mainly concentrated on foreign sales and reprinting older titles. After four years, Twin Circle discontinued the line because of poor distribution, and licensed the rights to other companies until it sold the rights to First Classics, Inc. in 2011.

Writers and artists
The work of adapting the source material and writing comics scripts was done by a group of mostly unknown writers. Alfred Sundel, a long-time editor on the series, scripted more than 20 first-edition adaptations and more than 10 revised editions. Others with a lot of script adaptation credits include Ken Fitch (sometimes credited as "Kenneth W. Fitch") with 22 issues, Harry G. Miller (sometimes credited as "Harry Glickman") with twelve, Evelyn Goodman with nine, and John O'Rourke with nine. Other writers with multiple adaptations to their names included Ruth Roche, George Lipscomb, Annette T. Rubenstein, and Sam Willinsky.

Henry C. Kiefer was the main artist for many issues of Classic Comics and Classics Illustrated, and his work came to define the "look" of the series. For Classic Comics, he illustrated the second cover for The Prince and the Pauper, issue #29, cover for The Adventures of Sherlock Holmes, issue #33, and the first Classics Illustrated issue The Last Days of Pompeii, issue #35. For Classics Illustrated, he drew the majority of at least 20 issues from the series in the period 1947–1953. Alex Blum also illustrated more than 20 issues of the series in the period 1948–1955. Norman Nodel illustrated more than 20 issues of Classics Illustrated (a number of them being re-issues with new art).

Other artists who contributed to Classic Comics include Lillian Chestney (Arabian Nights, issue #8, and Gulliver's Travels, issue #16), Webb and Brewster (Frankenstein, issue #26), and Matt Baker (Lorna Doone, issue #32). Oliver Twist (issue #23) was the first title produced by the Eisner & Iger shop.

Other notable artists who drew multiple issues of Classics Illustrated included George Evans, Lou Cameron, Reed Crandall, Pete Costanza, L.B. Cole, John Severin, Gray Morrow, and Joe Orlando. Lesser-known names with multiple credits include Rudy Palais, Arnold Hicks, Maurice Del Bourgo, Louis Zansky, August Froehlich, and Bob Webb, Jack Abel, Stephen Addeo, Charles J. Berger, Dik Browne, Denis Gifford, Roy Krenkel, John Parker, Norman Saunders, Joe Sinnott, Al Williamson and George Woodbridge.

Classics Illustrated Junior

Classics Illustrated Junior featured Albert Lewis Kanter's comic book adaptations of fairy and folk tale, myth and legends. In 1953, Classics Illustrated Junior debuted with Snow White and the Seven Dwarfs; the line eventually numbered 77 issues, ending publication in 1971. Issues included miscellanea such as an Aesop fable and a full-page illustration to color with crayons. Artists included John Costanza and Kurt Schaffenberger.

Classics Illustrated Special Issue 
Despite numbering that aligns with the main Classics Illustrated title, Classics Illustrated Special Issue is generally regarded as a separate title; instead of adaptations, subjects were historical or biographical. Published in December and June from December 1955 to 1964, issues were generally 100 pages long — twice the size of a typical Classics Illustrated. Notable artists included Angelo Torres, Bruno Premiani, Don Perlin, Edd Ashe, Everett Kinstler, George Evans, Gerald McCann, Graham Ingels, Gray Morrow, Jack Kirby & Dick Ayers, Joe Orlando, John Tartaglione, Norman Nodel, Pete Morisi, Reed Crandall, Sam Glanzman, and Sid Check.

1990–1991: First Comics 

In 1988 First Comics partnered with Berkley Publishing to acquire the rights, and announced it was reviving the Classics Illustrated brand with all-new adaptations. In 1990 (after some delays), Classics Illustrated returned after a nearly 30-year hiatus, with a line-up of artists that included Kyle Baker, Dean Motter, Mike Ploog, P. Craig Russell, Bill Sienkiewicz, Joe Staton, Rick Geary and Gahan Wilson.

The line lasted only a little over a year, publishing 27 issues. Titles solicited but never published were Kidnapped, Twenty Thousand Leagues Under the Sea, The Red Badge of Courage, The War of the Worlds, Around the World in Eighty Days, and The Last of the Mohicans. Kidnapped, adapted by Mike Vosburg, was later published by Papercutz in 2012.

1997–1998: Acclaim Books 
In 1997–1998, Acclaim Books (the successor to Valiant Comics) published a series of recolored reprints of the Gilberton issues in a digest size format with accompanying study notes by literary scholars. The Acclaim line included Mark Twain's Adventures of Huckleberry Finn, with art by Frank Giacoia; and The Three Musketeers, illustrated by George Evans. The series favored Mark Twain, also with reprints of Pudd'nhead Wilson, The Prince and the Pauper and Tom Sawyer. Other reprints in this series were Fyodor Dostoyevsky's Crime and Punishment, Herman Melville's Moby-Dick and Nathaniel Hawthorne's The House of the Seven Gables. The series lasted 62 issues, with three of the final four issues being all-new adaptations.

2008–2014: Papercutz 
In 2007, Papercutz acquired the Classics Illustrated license and announced that they would begin publishing new graphic novels ("Classics Illustrated Deluxe") as well as reprints of the First Comics series from 1990 to 1991. The new modern adaptations were largely produced in France; Papercutz published 12 volumes – including The Wind in the Willows, Frankenstein, Treasure Island, and The Adventures of Tom Sawyer – from 2008 to 2014.

The First Comics reprint series of adaptations was published by Papercutz in a different order from the originals and emphasized some of the later, low-circulation volumes. 19 issues were published (out of the original 27) from 2008 to 2014.

1989–present: First Classics, Inc. 
First Classics, Inc., formed in 1989, eventually took over management of the Classics Illustrated rights licensed to First Publishing (formerly First Comics) by the Frawley Corporation.

Starting in 2002, First Classics enlisted Jack Lake Productions (JLP) of Canada to produce Classics Illustrated and Classics Illustrated Junior books based on the original Gilberton lineup, many of them remastered by JLP.

In August 2011, First Classics purchased the rights to the Classics Illustrated family of books from Frawley Corporation. 

In 2020, First Classics and Jack Lake Productions settled their long-running dispute over the rights to Classics Illustrated. Some main outcomes of the settlement were that Jack Lake Productions and the artists involved with the CI book remastering will be cited in books that use the remastered art, and reaffirmation of First Classics as the rights holder to Classics Illustrated.

Through the years, First Classics worked with Trajectory, Inc. to license Classics Illustrated throughout the world, and also to create and make available many titles in the Classics Illustrated family of books in e-book format. First Classics currently publishes these e-books.
Classics Illustrated continues to be published throughout the world in various languages through license from First Classics. In English, Classic Comic Store of the UK publishes much of the Classics Illustrated lineup.

Digital editions 
In 2011, Marblehead, Massachusetts-based Trajectory Inc. issued the first digital editions of Gilberton Classics Illustrated regular and Junior lines. In 2014, Trajectory Inc. was granted the exclusive worldwide rights to produce, distribute and license the brand. The primary rights-holder for the digital editions is First Classics, Inc.

International editions

Brazil 
In 1948, the Brazilian comic book publisher  (EBAL) launched the  series, which reprinted many issues of Classics Illustrated, and which included original adaptations of Brazilian novels.

In the 1990s, Editora Abril published some stories from the First Comics Classics Illustrated series. In 2010, HQM Editora published Through the Looking-Glass, originally adapted in 1990 by Kyle Baker for the First Comics series.

Canada 
Gilberton published a Canadian version of Classics Illustrated in the period 1948–1951, putting out 78 issues.

In 2003, Toronto's Jack Lake Productions revived Classics Illustrated Junior, creating new remastered artwork from the original editions. In 2005, Jack Lake Productions published a Classics Illustrated 50th-anniversary edition of The War of the Worlds in both hard and softcover versions. In November 2007, Jack Lake Productions published for the first time in North America Classics Illustrated #170 The Aeneid (originally published in the UK) along with issues #1 of The Three Musketeers, #4 of The Last of the Mohicans, and #5 of Moby Dick.

In October 2016, Jack Lake Productions republished under the Classic Comics banner eleven remastered original Gilberton titles: 
 #11 Don Quixote
 #14 Westward Ho!
 #17 The Deerslayer
 #20 The Corsican Brothers
 #21 Three Famous Mysteries
 #22 The Pathfinder
 #79 Cyrano de Bergerac
 #122 The Mutineers
 #123 Fang and Claw
 #168 In Freedom's Cause
 #174 Captain Blood – new addition, originally published in Stories by Famous Authors Illustrated #2 (Seaboard Publishing, 1950).

Germany 
The German publisher Internationale Klassiker, later renamed Bildschriftenverlag (BSV), was founded in 1956 to publish translated editions of Classics Illustrated (as Illustrierte Klassiker). The company released 204 issues of the title from 1956 to 1972. BSV was acquired by National Periodical Publications (DC Comics) in 1966. In October 1973, the publisher became Williams (independent of BSV), with its headquarters on Elbchaussee in Hamburg. In 2013, the publisher BSV Hannover revived the title with issue #206; it continues to the present day.

Meanwhile, beginning in 1991 and lasting until 2002, the German publisher Norbert Hethke Verlag reprinted the Illustrierte Klassiker series.

Greece 
In Greece the series is named Κλασσικά Εικονογραφημένα (Klassiká Eikonografiména, meaning "Classics Illustrated") and has been published continuously since 1951 by Εκδόσεις Πεχλιβανίδη (Ekdóseis Pechlivanídi, Pechlivanídis Publications). It is based on the American series, with the difference that well-known Greek illustrators and novelists work to adapt stories of particular Greek interest. In addition to the titles that were translated from the US Classics Illustrated more than 70 titles were published with themes from Greek mythology and Greek history. Κλασσικά Εικονογραφημένα are read by thousands of young Greeks, and the first issues are of interest to collectors.

The publishing house of Κλασσικά Εικονογραφημένα, Εκδόσεις Πεχλιβανίδη (Pechlivanídis Publications), was founded by three brothers of the Πεχλιβανίδης (Pechlivanídis) family from the Greek-speaking parts of Asia Minor: Μιχάλης, Michális, Michael; Κώστας, Kóstas; and Γιώργος, Giórgos, George), collectively known as αδελφοί Πεχλιβανίδη (Pechlivanídis brothers). They had extensive experience in publishing from the 1920s, mainly in advertising – but also in children's books after 1936, when Κώστας Πεχλιβανίδης (Kóstas Pechlivanídis) finished his studies in the – then modern – printing techniques in Leipzig.

The Pechlivanídis brothers had inherited the printing press of Bavarian lithographer Grundman – and his experience as well. Having worked for years with offset printing, the Pechlivanídis brothers founded after the war the Εκδόσεις Ατλαντίς (Atlantis Publications) house in order to restart publishing children's books. They had read Classics Illustrated while traveling in the US, and arranged to publish them in Greece as well.

The first issue of Κλασσικά Εικονογραφημένα was made available on 1 March 1951. It was an adaptation of Victor Hugo's Les Misérables, and attracted extensive critique in Greece, both positive and negative. It was the first "American" kind of comic in Greece and also the first four-color or tetrachromous offset (with 336 multicolored illustrations as the front page advertised). Its cost at the time was 4,000 drachmas, and the first edition (90,000 copies) went out of print quickly and was reprinted twice in the following days. According to Atlantis, it sold about a million copies.

United Kingdom

Thorpe & Porter / Williams 
The British publisher Thorpe & Porter published Classics Illustrated reprints (and a few original stories) from 1951 to 1963. Of the 181 British issues, 13 had never appeared in America. Additionally, there were some variations in cover art.

The British Classics Illustrated adaptation of Dr. No was never published under the U.S. Classics Illustrated line, but instead was sold to DC Comics, which published it in 1963 as part of their superhero anthology series, Showcase. The comic followed the plot of the film with images of the film's actors rather than Ian Fleming's original novel.

In 1976–1977, the successor company to Thorpe & Porter, Williams Publishing, released the Double Duo series, which for the first time reprinted translated issues of Classics Illustrated originally published in Swedish (by Illustrerade klassiker / Williams Förlags AB) in the period 1964–1970. Each digest-sized issue contained two stories, coming in at a total of 68 pages per issue. All the stories were illustrated by members of a Spanish comics studio.

Classic Comic Store 
In September 2008, Classic Comic Store, based in the U.K., began publishing both the original Gilberton Classics Illustrated regular and Junior lines for distribution in the U.K., Republic of Ireland, South Africa, Australia and New Zealand. The issue number sequence is different from the original runs, although the Junior series was in the same sequence as the original, but with numbering starting at 1 instead of 501. The covers were digitally 'cleaned up' and enhanced, based on the original US covers. In September 2009, Classic Comic Store Ltd announced that although they would continue to publish the Classics Illustrated titles, they were no longer publishing the Junior series after issue 12, but rather importing the issues from Canada. This meant that the numbers used would be as per the Canadian issues (i.e. the first one imported would be issue 513). In October 2012 (when issue 44 had been dispatched), Classic Comic Store Ltd no longer continued with a subscription service in the UK, because of the costs involved. The company told subscribers that they were planning on producing four issues at a time, but not on a specified time scale. The first of these batches (issues 45–48) was produced in October 2013. The second batch (49, 57–62) was available in August 2016 (although the issues stated "First Published May 2016"). The gap (50–56) was a result of the artwork for them being unavailable to Classic Comic Store in refreshed form, the intention being to publish them at a future date; this was completed by March 2019, after which issues continued to be produced in order from the last previously-published issue.

New publications for Classic Comic Store editions:
 July 2011: Nicholas Nickleby (issue #32) became the first new title in the 48-page series since Gilberton's 1969 publication of #169 (Negro Americans: The Early Years). The artwork came from the November 1950 Stories by Famous Authors Illustrated (Seaboard Publishing) edition of Nicholas Nickleby and retained the original Gustav Schrotter interior art.
 October 2012: The 39 Steps (issue #44) became the second brand-new title to the Classics Illustrated canon.
 September 2013: The Argonauts (issue #48) was published – one of 13 which were never issued in the US collection but only in the UK.
 March 2019: The Aeneid (issue #72) was published – another which was not issued in the original US collection but only in the UK – although in 2007, it was issued in North America as #170.
 March 2019: Through the Looking-Glass (issue 73) was published – this was not issued in the original US collection, but was published in 1990 as #3 in the First Comics run.

Issues

Original Elliot/Gilberton run 
Authorship is based on William B. Jones, Jr.'s Classics Illustrated: A Cultural History, second edition (Jefferson, N.C.: McFarland & Company, Inc., 2002), Appendices A and B; as well as the information held by Michigan State University Libraries Special Collections Division in their Reading Room Index to the Comic Art Collection as well as the Grand Comics Database.

Classics Illustrated Special Issue 
Publication dates from Classics Central.

Thorpe & Porter new issues

Double Duo issues

First Comics run 
The authorship is based on the Grand Comics Database.

Acclaim Books new issues

PapercutzClassics Illustrated Deluxe graphic novels

Classic Comic Store [UK], 2008 – run 
The authorship is based on the information held by Michigan State University Libraries, Special Collections Division in their Reading Room Index to the Comic Art Collection and/or the copyright information inside the books.

The titles and publication dates are obtained from a personal collection.

Classic Comic Store UK run – Notes

In other media 
The Classics Illustrated branding was on a series of television films produced from 1977 to 1982 by Schick Sunn Classics; one of the executives at Shick Sunn Classics was Patrick Frawley, who at that point owned the Classics Illustrated brand: 
 Last of the Mohicans (1977)
 Donner Pass: The Road to Survival (1978)
 The Time Machine (1978)
 The Deerslayer (1978)
 The Legend of Sleepy Hollow (1980)
 The Adventures of Nellie Bly (1981)
 The Adventures of Huckleberry Finn (1981)
 The Fall of the House of Usher (1982)

References in popular culture
 In the film Major League, Jake Taylor (Tom Berenger) reads the Classics Illustrated edition of Moby Dick in an effort to impress his former girlfriend, Lynn (Rene Russo) in the hopes that he might win her back (which he eventually does). Later on in the film, other teammates like Rick Vaughn (Charlie Sheen), Willie Mays Hayes (Wesley Snipes), and Roger Dorn (Corbin Bernsen) start reading other Classics Illustrated titles, such as The Song of Hiawatha, The Deerslayer, and Crime and Punishment.
 A copy of the Classics Illustrated version of David Copperfield figures in the film Heaven Help Us. At one point, the character Caesar (Malcolm Danare) is baffled by why a book report written by his friend Rooney (Kevin Dillon) contains continued references to W.C. Fields instead of Wilkins Micawber. Rooney responds by displaying the cover of the comic book, which depicts Fields as Mr. Micawber, based on his role in the 1935 film.
 Classics Illustrated #108, Knights of the Round Table (June 1953, Gilberton) is mentioned in the Warner Bros./CW show Supernatural season 8, episode 21: "The Great Escapist" (written by Ben Edlund, original air date 1 May 2013). Sam Winchester, ill and delirious, recalls to his brother Dean the memory of Dean reading the story to him when they were both small children. Sam laments that as he thought of the knights' purity, it made him realize that, even though he was a child, he was impure – and that he always knew deep down he was impure.
 In Arundhati Roy's book The God of Small Things (1997), "Rahel wasn't sure what she suffered from, but occasionally she practised sad faces, and sighing in the mirror.//'It is a far, far better thing that I do, than I have ever done', she would say to herself sadly. That was Rahel being Sydney Carton being Charles Darnay, as he stood on the steps, waiting to be guillotined, in the Classics Illustrated comic's version of A Tale of Two Cities".

Cover gallery

See also

Other companies or series producing comic adaptations of literature:

 Amar Chitra Katha – Indian publisher producing comic book adaptations of Indian legends and epics
 Classical Comics –  British publisher producing graphic novel adaptations of the great works of literature, including Shakespeare, Charlotte Brontë, and Charles Dickens
 Graphic Classics – American anthology series produced from 2002 to 2016.
  – from the Spanish publisher Editorial Bruguera, produced 270 adaptations of classic stories from 1970 to 1983. 28 of these have been translated into English and published as King Classics.
 Manga de Dokuha - Japanese series of manga versions of classic literature. Produced 139 adaptations of literary classics from 2007 to 2017.
 Marvel Classics Comics – Marvel Comics successor to Classics Illustrated that operated 1976–1978, reprinting some Pendulum Press titles and do a number of their own original adaptations
 Marvel Illustrated – Marvel Comics imprint founded in 2007 specializing in comic book adaptations of literary classics
 PAICO Classics – Indian series from the mid-1980s reprinting Pendulum Press's titles from the 1970s
 Pendulum Press – picked up comic book adaptations of classic literature in 1973
 Self Made Hero – British company producing adaptations of literature, including some of the same Shakespeare plays as Classical Comics

Notes

Citations

References

Goulart, Ron. Great American Comic Books. Publications International, Ltd., 2001.
Jones, William B., Jr., Classics Illustrated: A Cultural History, with Illustrations (Jefferson, N.C.: McFarland & Company, Inc., 2002). Second edition, 2011. 
Malan, Dan. The Complete Guide to Classics Illustrated. Classics Central.Com, 2006.
 
Overstreet, Robert M.. Official Overstreet Comic Book Price Guide. House of Collectibles, 2004.
Richardson, Donna "Classics Illustrated." American Heritage, Vol. 44.3, May/June 1993.

External links

Classics Illustrated at the Internet Archive
Complete list of Classics Illustrated and Classics Illustrated Junior
Classics Illustrated licensing information: First Classics, Inc.
Classics Illustrated by Papercutz
Classics Central
Review of War Of The Worlds Classics Illustrated
Review of Great Expectations, Comics Bulletin
In Praise of Classic Comics – slideshow by Life magazine

Comics magazines published in the United States
Golden Age comics titles
1941 comics debuts
1969 comics endings
First Comics titles
Valiant Comics titles
Comics based on poems
Comics based on novels
Magazines established in 1941
Magazines disestablished in 1969
Comics based on fiction
Defunct American comics
Papercutz (publisher) titles